The internal pudendal veins (internal pudic veins) are a set of veins in the pelvis. They are the venae comitantes of the internal pudendal artery. Internal pudendal veins are enclosed by pudendal canal, with internal pudendal artery and pudendal nerve.

They begin in the deep veins of the vulva and of the penis, issuing from the bulb of the vestibule and the bulb of the penis, respectively. They accompany the internal pudendal artery, and unite to form a single vessel, which ends in the internal iliac vein.

They receive the veins from the urethral bulb, the perineal and inferior hemorrhoidal veins.

The deep dorsal vein of the penis communicates with the internal pudendal veins, but ends mainly in the pudendal plexus.

References

External links
  - "Gluteal Region: Pudendal Nerve and Internal Pudendal Vessels"
  - "The Female Perineum: The Sacrotuberous and the Sacrospinous Ligaments"

Veins of the torso